An elder is someone with a degree of seniority or authority.

Elder or elders may refer to:

Positions

Administrative 
 Elder (administrative title), a position of authority

Cultural 
 North American Indigenous elder, a person who has and transmits cultural and philosophical knowledge
 Australian Aboriginal elder, one who has gained recognition as a custodian of knowledge and lore, often a leader in administrative matters

Religious 
 "The elder", author of the Johannine epistles 2 John and 3 John in the New Testament
 Elder (Christianity), a person valued for their wisdom and, in some churches and denominations, holding an administrative or oversight role
 Elder (Methodist), an ordained minister with responsibilities to preach and teach
 Elder (Anglican), a learned minister with responsibilities to teach and/or innovate
 Elder (Latter Day Saints), a priesthood office in the Melchizedek priesthood
 Thero or Elder, an honorific term for senior Buddhist nuns and monks

Places 
Antarctica
 Elder Bluff, Palmer Land
 Elder Glacier, Victoria Land
 Elder Peak, Oates Land
 Mount Elder, South Shetland Islands
Australia
 Elder Range, part of the Flinders Ranges in South Australia
 Electoral district of Elder, South Australia
 Elder Park, Adelaide, South Australia
Canada
 Elder Island, Nunavut
USA
 Elder, Georgia
 Elder Township, Cambria County, Pennsylvania

In entertainment 
 Elder (band), a rock/metal band from Boston
 Elders (Charmed), characters in the Charmed television series
 Elders of the Universe, supervillains appearing in Marvel Comics
 Mole Man or Harvey Rupert Elder, a fictional character in Marvel Comics
 The Elder, an independent film adaptation of the 1981 Kiss concept album Music from "The Elder
 "The Elder", an episode of Star Wars: Visions

People 
 Elder (surname), a list of people
 Elder (given name), a list of people
 Élder (footballer) (born 1976), a Brazilian former footballer Élder Alencar Machado de Campos
 List of people known as the Elder or the Younger

Plants 
 Box elder, Acer negundo, North American species of maple
 Ground elder (Aegopodium podagraria), common edible garden perennial, widely considered a weed
 Yellow elder (Tecoma stans), flowering perennial shrub in the trumpet vine family
 Sambucus, also known as elder or elderberry, a genus of fast-growing shrubs or small trees
 Marsh elder or Iva, a genus of wind-pollinated plants in the daisy family

Other uses 
 Elder (constructor), a former racing car constructor
 The Elders (organization), an international non-governmental organisation of statesmen, peace activists, and human rights advocates
 , a US Navy World War II anti-submarine net laying ship
 Elder High School, Cincinnati, Ohio
 Elders Limited, an Australian agribusiness company
 Elder Pharmaceuticals, a company headquartered in Mumbai, India
 An old English word for udder

See also 
 Council of Elders (disambiguation)
 Eldership (disambiguation)
 Eider (disambiguation)
 Alder (disambiguation)
 Elderly, adjective for people with ages nearing or surpassing the life expectancy of human beings